Harold Chase may refer to:

 Hal Chase (Harold Homer Chase, 1883–1947), Major League Baseball player
 Harold H. Chase (1912–1976), American politician
 Harold W. Chase (1922–1982), American political scientist, general, and Defense Department official